Alice Marble defeated Kay Stammers in the final, 6–2, 6–0 to win the ladies' singles tennis title at the 1939 Wimbledon Championships. Helen Moody was the defending champion, but did not compete.

Seeds

  Alice Marble (champion)
  Helen Jacobs (quarterfinals)
  Hilde Sperling (semifinals)
  Simonne Mathieu (quarterfinals)
  Jadwiga Jędrzejowska (quarterfinals)
  Kay Stammers (final)
  Mary Hardwick (quarterfinals)
  Sarah Fabyan (semifinals)

Draw

Finals

Top half

Section 1

Section 2

Section 3

Section 4

Bottom half

Section 5

Section 6

Section 7

Section 8

References

External links

Women's Singles
Wimbledon Championship by year – Women's singles
Wimbledon Championships - singles
Wimbledon Championships - singles